A fan is a powered machine used to create a flow of air. A fan consists of a rotating arrangement of vanes or blades, generally made of wood, plastic, or metal, which act on the air. The rotating assembly of blades and hub is known as an impeller, rotor, or runner. Usually, it is contained within some form of housing, or case. This may direct the airflow, or increase safety by preventing objects from contacting the fan blades. Most fans are powered by electric motors, but other sources of power may be used, including hydraulic motors, handcranks, and internal combustion engines.

Mechanically, a fan can be any revolving vane, or vanes used for producing currents of air. Fans produce air flows with high volume and low pressure (although higher than ambient pressure), as opposed to compressors which produce high pressures at a comparatively low volume. A fan blade will often rotate when exposed to an air-fluid stream, and devices that take advantage of this, such as anemometers and wind turbines, often have designs similar to that of a fan.

Typical applications include climate control and personal thermal comfort (e.g., an electric table or floor fan), vehicle engine cooling systems (e.g., in front of a radiator), machinery cooling systems (e.g., inside computers and audio power amplifiers), ventilation, fume extraction, winnowing (e.g., separating chaff of cereal grains), removing dust (e.g. sucking as in a vacuum cleaner), drying (usually in combination with a heat source) and providing draft for a fire.  Some fans may be indirectly used for cooling in the case of industrial heat exchangers.

While fans are effective at cooling people, they do not cool air, but rather work by evaporative cooling of sweat and increased heat convection into the surrounding air, due to the airflow from the fans. Thus, fans may become less effective at cooling the body if the surrounding air is near body temperature and contains high humidity.

History 

The punkah (a.k.a fan) was used in India about 500 BCE. It was a handheld fan made from bamboo strips or other plant fiber, that could be rotated or fanned to move air. During British rule, the word came to be used by Anglo-Indians to mean a large swinging flat fan, fixed to the ceiling and pulled by a servant called the punkawallah.

For purposes of air conditioning, the Han Dynasty craftsman and engineer Ding Huan (fl. 180 CE) invented a manually operated rotary fan with seven wheels that measured 3 m (10 ft) in diameter; in the 8th century, during the Tang Dynasty (618–907), the Chinese applied hydraulic power to rotate the fan wheels for air conditioning, while the rotary fan became even more common during the Song Dynasty (960–1279).

In the 17th century, the experiments of scientists including Otto von Guericke, Robert Hooke and Robert Boyle, established the basic principles of vacuum and airflow. The English architect Sir Christopher Wren applied an early ventilation system in the Houses of Parliament that used bellows to circulate air. Wren's design would be the catalyst for much later improvement and innovation. The first rotary fan used in Europe was for mine ventilation during the 16th century, as illustrated by Georg Agricola (1494–1555).

John Theophilus Desaguliers, a British engineer, demonstrated the successful use of a fan system to draw out stagnant air from coal mines in 1727 and soon afterward he installed a similar apparatus in Parliament. Good ventilation was particularly important in coal mines to reduce casualties from asphyxiation. The civil engineer John Smeaton, and later John Buddle installed reciprocating air pumps in the mines in the North of England. However, this arrangement was not as ideal as the machinery was liable to breaking down.

Steam 
In 1849 a 6m radius steam-driven fan, designed by William Brunton, was made operational in the Gelly Gaer Colliery of South Wales. The model was exhibited at the Great Exhibition of 1851. Also in 1851 David Boswell Reid, a Scottish doctor, installed four steam-powered fans in the ceiling of St George's Hospital in Liverpool, so that the pressure produced by the fans would force the incoming air upward and through vents in the ceiling. Improvements in the technology were made by James Nasmyth, Frenchman Theophile Guibal and J. R. Waddle.

Electrical 

Between 1882 and 1886 Schuyler Wheeler invented a fan powered by electricity. It was commercially marketed by the American firm Crocker & Curtis electric motor company. In 1885 a desktop direct drive electric fan was commercially available by Stout, Meadowcraft & Co. in New York.

In 1882, Philip Diehl developed the world's first electric ceiling mounted fan.  During this intense period of innovation, fans powered by alcohol, oil, or kerosene were common around the turn of the 20th century.
In 1909, KDK of Japan pioneered the invention of mass-produced electric fans for home use. In the 1920s, industrial advances allowed steel fans to be mass-produced in different shapes, bringing fan prices down and allowing more homeowners to afford them. In the 1930s, the first art deco fan (the "Silver Swan") was designed by Emerson. By the 1940s, Crompton Greaves of India became the world's largest manufacturer of electric ceiling fans mainly for sale in India, Asia, and the Middle East. By the 1950s, table and stand fans were manufactured in bright colors and eye-catching.

Window and central air conditioning in the 1960s caused many companies to discontinue production of fans, but in the mid-1970s, with an increasing awareness of the cost of electricity and the amount of energy used to heat and cool homes, turn-of-the-century styled ceiling fans became immensely popular again as both decorative and energy-efficient units.

In 1998 William Fairbank and Walter K. Boyd invented the high-volume low-speed (HVLS) ceiling fan, designed to reduce energy consumption by using long fan blades rotating at low speed to move a relatively large volume of air.

Types 

Mechanical revolving blade fans are made in a wide range of designs. They are used on the floor, table, desk, or hung from the ceiling (ceiling fan). They can also be built into a window, wall, roof, chimney, etc. Most electronic systems such as computers include fans to cool the circuits inside, and in appliances such as hair dryers and portable space heaters and mounted/installed wall heaters. They are also used for moving air in air-conditioning systems, and in automotive engines, where they are driven by belts or by a direct motor. Fans used for comfort create a wind chill by increasing the heat transfer coefficient but do not lower temperatures directly. Fans used to cool electrical equipment or in engines or other machines do cool the equipment directly by forcing hot air into the cooler environment outside of the machine.

There are three main types of fans used for moving air, axial, centrifugal (also called radial) and cross flow (also called tangential). The American Society of Mechanical Engineers Performance Testing Code 11 (PTC) provides standard procedures for conducting and reporting tests on fans, including those of the centrifugal, axial, and mixed flows.

Axial-flow 

Axial-flow fans have blades that force air to move parallel to the shaft about which the blades rotate. This type of fan is used in a wide variety of applications, ranging from small cooling fans for electronics to the giant fans used in cooling towers. Axial flow fans are applied in air conditioning and industrial process applications. Standard axial flow fans have diameters of 300–400 mm or 1,800–2,000 mm and work under pressures up to 800 Pa. Special types of fans are used as low-pressure compressor stages in aircraft engines.
Examples of axial fans are:
 Table fan: Basic elements of a typical table fan include the fan blade, base, armature, and lead wires, motor, blade guard, motor housing, oscillator gearbox, and oscillator shaft. The oscillator is a mechanism that motions the fan from side to side. The armature axle shaft comes out on both ends of the motor, one end of the shaft is attached to the blade and the other is attached to the oscillator gearbox. The motor case joins to the gearbox to contain the rotor and stator. The oscillator shaft combines the weighted base and the gearbox. A motor housing covers the oscillator mechanism. The blade guard joins to the motor case for safety.
 Domestic Extractor Fan: Wall or ceiling mounted, the domestic extractor fan is employed to remove moisture and stale air from domestic dwellings. Bathroom extractor fans typically utilize a four-inch (100 mm) impeller, whilst kitchen extractor fans typically use a six-inch (150 mm) impeller as the room itself is often bigger. Axial fans with five-inch (125 mm) impellers are also used in larger bathrooms though are much less common. Domestic axial extractor fans are not suitable for duct runs over 3 m or 4 m, depending on the number of bends in the run, as the increased air pressure in longer pipework inhibits the performance of the fan. 
 Electro-mechanical fans: Among collectors, are rated according to their condition, size, age, and several blades. Four-blade designs are the most common. Five-blade or six-blade designs are rare. The materials from which the components are made, such as brass, are important factors in fan desirability.
 Ceiling fan: A fan suspended from the ceiling of a room is a ceiling fan. Most ceiling fans rotate at relatively low speeds and do not have blade guards. Ceiling fans can be found in both residential and industrial/commercial settings.
 In automobiles, a mechanical or electrically driven fan provides engine cooling and prevents the engine from overheating by blowing or drawing air through a coolant-filled radiator. The fan may be driven with a belt and pulley off the engine's crankshaft or an electric motor switched on or off by a thermostatic switch.
 Computer fan for cooling electrical components and in laptop coolers
 Fans inside audio power amplifiers help to draw heat away from the electrical components.
 Variable pitch fan: A variable-pitch fan is used where precise control of static pressure within supply ducts is required. The blades are arranged to rotate upon a control-pitch hub. The fan wheel will spin at a constant speed. The blades follow the control pitch hub. As the hub moves toward the rotor, the blades increase their angle of attack and an increase in flow results.

Centrifugal 

Often called a "squirrel cage" (because of its general similarity in appearance to exercise wheels for pet rodents) or "scroll fan", the centrifugal fan has a moving component (called an impeller) that consists of a central shaft about which a set of blades that form a spiral, or ribs, are positioned. Centrifugal fans blow air at right angles to the intake of the fan and spin the air outwards to the outlet (by deflection and centrifugal force). The impeller rotates, causing air to enter the fan near the shaft and move perpendicularly from the shaft to the opening in the scroll-shaped fan casing. A centrifugal fan produces more pressure for a given air volume, and is used where this is desirable such as in leaf blowers, blowdryers, air mattress inflators, inflatable structures, climate control in air handling units   and various industrial purposes. They are typically noisier than comparable axial fans (although some types of centrifugal fans are quieter such as in air handling units).

Cross-flow 

The cross-flow or tangential fan, sometimes known as a tubular fan, was patented in 1893 by Paul Mortier, and is used extensively in heating, ventilation, and air conditioning (HVAC), especially in ductless split air conditioners. The fan is usually long relative to its diameter, so the flow remains approximately two-dimensional away from the ends. The cross-flow fan uses an impeller with forward-curved blades, placed in a housing consisting of a rear wall and a vortex wall. Unlike radial machines, the main flow moves transversely across the impeller, passing the blading twice.

The flow within a cross-flow fan may be broken up into three distinct regions: a vortex region near the fan discharge, called an eccentric vortex, the through-flow region, and a paddling region directly opposite. Both the vortex and paddling regions are dissipative, and as a result, only a portion of the impeller imparts usable work on the flow. The cross-flow fan, or transverse fan, is thus a two-stage partial admission machine. The popularity of the crossflow fan in HVAC comes from its compactness, shape, quiet operation, and ability to provide a high pressure coefficient. Effectively a rectangular fan in terms of inlet and outlet geometry, the diameter readily scales to fit the available space, and the length is adjustable to meet flow rate requirements for the particular application.

Common household tower fans are also cross-flow fans. Much of the early work focused on developing the cross-flow fan for both high- and low-flow-rate conditions and resulted in numerous patents. Key contributions were made by Coester, Ilberg and Sadeh, Porter and Markland, and Eck. One interesting phenomenon particular to the cross-flow fan is that, as the blades rotate, the local air incidence angle changes. The result is that in certain positions the blades act as compressors (pressure increase), while at other azimuthal locations the blades act as turbines (pressure decrease).

Since the flow both enters and exits the impeller radially, the crossflow fan has been studied and prototyped for potential aircraft applications. Due to the two-dimensional nature of the flow, the fan can be integrated into a wing for use in both thrust production and boundary-layer control. A configuration that utilizes a crossflow fan is located at the wing leading edge is the FanWing design concept initially developed around 1997 and under development by a company of the same name. This design creates lift by deflecting the wake downward due to the rotational direction of the fan, causing a large Magnus force, similar to a spinning leading-edge cylinder. Another configuration utilizing a crossflow fan for thrust and flow control is the propulsive wing, another experimental concept prototype initially developed in the 1990s and 2000s. In this design, the crossflow fan is placed near the trailing edge of a thick wing and draws the air of the wing's suction (top) surface. By doing this, the propulsive wing is nearly stall-free, even at extremely high angles of attack, producing very high lift. However, the fanwing and propulsive wing concepts remain experimental and have only been used for unmanned prototypes.

A cross-flow fan is a centrifugal fan in which the air flows straight through the fan instead of at a right angle. The rotor of a cross-flow fan is covered to create a pressure differential. Cross-flow fans are made to have a double circular arc rear wall with a thick vortex wall that decreases in  radial gap. The gap decreases in the direction of the fans impeller rotation. The rear wall has a log-spiral profile while the vortex stabilizer is a horizontal thin wall with rounded edge. The resultant pressure difference allows air to flow straight through the fan, even though the fan blades counter the flow of air on one side of the rotation. Cross-flow fans give airflow along the entire width of the fan; however, they are noisier than ordinary centrifugal fans. Cross-flow fans are often used in ductless air conditioners, air doors, in some types of laptop coolers, in automobile ventilation systems, and for cooling in medium-sized equipment such as photocopiers.

Bladeless fans 

Dyson Air Multiplier fans introduced to the consumer market in 2009 have popularized a 1981 design by Toshiba that produces a fan that has no exposed fan blades or other visibly moving parts (unless augmented by other features such as for oscillation and directional adjustment). A relatively small quantity of air from a high-pressure-bladed impeller fan, which is contained inside the base rather than exposed, induces the slower flow of a larger airmass through a circular or oval-shaped opening via a low-pressure area created by an airfoil surface shape (the Coandă effect).

Air curtains and air doors also utilize this effect to help retain warm or cool air within an otherwise exposed area that lacks a cover or door. Air curtains are commonly used on open-face dairy, freezer, and vegetable displays to help retain chilled air within the cabinet using a laminar airflow circulated across the display opening. The airflow is typically generated by a mechanical fan of any type described in this article hidden in the base of the display cabinet. HVAC linear slot diffusers also utilize this effect to increase airflow evenly in rooms compared to registers while reducing the energy used by the air handling unit blower.

Installation
Fans may be installed in various ways, according to the application. They are often used in a free installation, without any housing of any kind. There are also some specialised installations.

Ducted fan
 In vehicles, a ducted fan is a method of propulsion in which a fan, propeller or rotor is surrounded by an aerodynamic duct or shroud which enhances its performance to create aerodynamic thrust or lift to transport the vehicle.

Jet fan
In ventilation systems a jet fan, also known as an impulse or induction fan, ejects a stream of air which entrains ambient air along with it, in order to circulate the ambient air. The system takes up less space than conventional ventilation ducting and can significantly increase the rates of inflow of fresh air and expulsion of stale air.

Noise 
Fans generate noise from the rapid flow of air around blades and obstacles causing vortexes, and from the motor. Fan noise is roughly proportional to the fifth power of fan speed; halving speed reduces noise by about 15 dB.

The perceived loudness of fan noise also depends on the frequency distribution of the noise. This in turn depends on the shape and distribution of moving parts, especially of the blades, and of stationary parts, struts in particular. Like with tire treads, and similar to the principle of acoustic diffusors, an irregular shape and distribution can flatten the noise spectrum, making the noise sound less disturbing.

The inlet shape of the fan can also influence the noise levels generated by the fan.

Fan motor drive methods 

Standalone fans are usually powered by an electric motor, often attached directly to the motor's output, with no gears or belts. The motor is either hidden in the fan's center hub or extends behind it. For big industrial fans, three-phase asynchronous motors are commonly used, may be placed near the fan, and drive it through a belt and pulleys. Smaller fans are often powered by shaded pole AC motors, or brushed or brushless DC motors. AC-powered fans usually use mains voltage, while DC-powered fans typically use low voltage, typically 24V, 12V, or 5 V.

In machines with a rotating part, the fan is often connected to it rather than being powered separately. This is commonly seen in motor vehicles with internal combustion engines, large cooling systems, locomotives, and winnowing machines, where the fan is connected to the drive shaft or through a belt and pulleys. Another common configuration is a dual-shaft motor, where one end of the shaft drives a mechanism, while the other has a fan mounted on it to cool the motor itself. Window air conditioners commonly use a dual-shaft fan to operate separate fans for the interior and exterior parts of the device.

Where electrical power or rotating parts are not readily available, fans may be driven by other methods. High-pressure gases such as steam can be used to drive a small turbine, and high-pressure liquids can be used to drive a pelton wheel, either which can provide the rotational drive for a fan.

Large, slow-moving energy sources such as a flowing river can also power a fan using a water wheel and a series of step-down gears or pulleys to increase the rotational speed to that which is required for efficient fan operation.

Solar power 
Electric fans used for ventilation may be powered by solar panels instead of mains current. This is an attractive option because once the capital costs of the solar panel have been covered, the resulting electricity is free. Also, electricity is always available when the sun is shining and the fan needs to run.
During the absence of electric power solar powered fan is operate the air flowing and maintain environmental condition. 
A typical example uses a detached 10-watt,  solar panel and is supplied with appropriate brackets, cables, and connectors. Because of the wide availability of 12 V brushless DC electric motors and the convenience of wiring such a low voltage, such fans usually operate on 12 volts.

Other permanently-mounted and small portable fans include an integrated (non-detachable) solar panel.

See also

References

External links 
 

 
Turbomachinery
Cooling technology
Ventilation
Heating, ventilation, and air conditioning
Mechanical engineering
Chemical engineering
Gas compressors
Turbines
Thermodynamics
Fluid dynamics
Aerodynamics
Articles containing video clips